Boacica River is a river of Alagoas state in eastern Brazil.

See also
List of rivers of Alagoas

References
Brazilian Ministry of Transport

Rivers of Alagoas